The 2021 Football Northern Territory season in Northern Territory. The men's competitions consisted of three major divisions across the State.

League table

2021 NorZone Premier League
The season began on 9 April, concluding with the Grand Final on 25 September.

Finals series

2021 NorZone Division One
The season began on 9 April, concluding with the Grand Final on 18 September.

Finals series

2021 Southern Zone Premier League
The season began on 17 April, concluding with the Grand Final on 11 September.

Finals series

References

2021 in Australian soccer
Soccer in the Northern Territory